Heleysundet is a narrow sound between Kükenthaløya and Spitsbergen. It is known for its violent tidal races.

Heleysundet was discovered (and named) by the 60-ton ship John Ellis in 1617, which had been sent out by the Muscovy Company to explore to the south-eastwards of Spitsbergen. The sound was named after the Englishman William Heley (born 1594/95), a supercargo and vice-admiral of the English whaling fleet from 1617 to 1623.

References 

Conway, W. M. 1906. No Man's Land: A History of Spitsbergen from Its Discovery in 1596 to the Beginning of the Scientific Exploration of the Country. Cambridge: At the University Press.
 Johansen, B. J. (ed.) 2009.  Søraust-Svalbard's geology and landscape. In: Cruise Handbook for Svalbard. Norwegian Polar Institute. 
 Norwegian Polar Institute Place Names of Svalbard Database
Purchas, S. 1625. Hakluytus Posthumus or Purchas His Pilgrimes: Contayning a History of the World in Sea Voyages and Lande Travells by Englishmen and others. Volumes XIII and XIV (Reprint 1906 J. Maclehose and sons). 

Fjords of Svalbard